Sir Bellingham Reginald Graham, 7th Baronet   (4 November 1789 – 15 June 1866) was an English Baronet.

He served as an Army officer, initially as a cornet with the 23rd Light Dragoons from 1808. He was a lieutenant serving in the 10th Royal Hussars in 1810 and by 1811, was serving as a lieutenant colonel in the Clare Regiment of Local Militia. He took over the Clare Regiment of Local Militia as Lieutenant Colonel Commandant in January 1813. He resigned as Commandant in 1819, following a public disagreement with Lord Grantham.

Graham was appointed a Deputy Lieutenant for North Riding of Yorkshire in 1812.

Graham had several sporting interests, most notably as a first-class cricketer who played for Middlesex. He is recorded in one match in 1815, totalling 0 runs with a highest score of 0. He was more closely associated with equine sports, serving as the Master of Hounds for a number of different hunts, including the Quorn Hunt and the Albrighton Hunt. His equine activities extended to racehorses for a period, and he owned the 1816 winner of the St Leger Stakes, The Duchess.

Yachting was another of Graham's interests; he was a member of the Royal Yacht Squadron at Cowes, serving as Vice-Commodore from 1848 to 1850. He owned several yachts including Harriet and Flirt.

He spent time at the Boodle's gentleman's club in his later years.

Family 

Graham was married twice, firstly to Harriet Clark with whom he had four children, though only one, also called Harriet, would survive to adulthood.

 Harriet Graham (died 1884); married firstly to Lieutenant-General Sir Frederick Ashworth, then to George Chichester, 3rd Marquess of Donegall.

Clark died in Paris in 1830 following an accident with a carriage. He remarried in 1831 to Harriet Cottam. They together had five children, all of whom survived to adulthood.

 Sir Reginald Henry Graham, 8th Baronet (1835–1920) who succeeded his father as 8th Baronet. Married to Annie Mary Shiffner, they had three children, including Sir Reginald Guy Graham, 9th Baronet.
 Major-General George Fergus Graham (1836–1930) married Margaret Anne Atkinson. They had one child, a son. 
 Augusta Clementina (died 1875), married Major Edmund de Feyl. They had one child, a daughter.
 Charlotte Harriet (died 1927), unmarried. Charlotte was a nun with St Peter's sisterhood, London. 
 Gertrude Elizabeth Priscilla (died 1927), married Count Arthur Dillon.

References

Bibliography
 
 

English cricketers
English cricketers of 1787 to 1825
Middlesex cricketers
1789 births
1866 deaths
Baronets in the Baronetage of England
Deputy Lieutenants of the North Riding of Yorkshire
English male sailors (sport)